Events in the year 2022 in Transnistria.

Incumbents 
 President of Transnistria: Vadim Krasnoselsky
 Prime Minister of Transnistria: Aleksandr Martynov (until 30 May), Aleksandr Rozenberg (since 30 May)
 Speaker of the Supreme Council: Alexander Korshunov

Events 
Ongoing – COVID-19 pandemic in Transnistria

January 
 20 January – Aleksandr Rozenberg is appointed as the new Minister of Agriculture and Natural Resources.

April 
 25 April
 2022 Transnistria attacks: Explosions hit the headquarters of the Ministry of State Security in the capital Tiraspol, at 18:00 local time (15:00 GMT).
 The Tiraspol Airport was attacked from the air at 23:30, possibly having been from a drone strike; two explosives had been dropped on the air base of the airport. The windows and hood of a ZIL-131 truck were damaged.
 26 April
 2022 Transnistria attacks: Two explosions in the Grigoriopol transmitter were reported in Maiac, the first one at 6:40 and the second at 7:05, knocking out two radio antennas that broadcast Russian radio stations. No injuries were reported on the site and nobody has claimed responsibility.
 A self-proclaimed "group of patriots" of the Ministry of State Security sent a document in Russian to the editorial team of the Moldovan newspaper AVA appealing to their state authorities, representatives of diplomatic missions, and to Moldovan and Ukrainian media and law enforcement institutions.
 27 April
The ministry claim that the drones came from Ukraine.
 The media outlet TV PMR release a video and new information about the attack on April 25, that the bombers arrived in Tiraspol in a car from the area of Grigoriopol, after illegally crossing the border from Ukraine.

May 
 6 May – 2022 Transnistria attacks: Four explosions are reported near a former aerodrome in Vărăncău at 9:40, by at least two drones. An hour later, the incident was repeated.
 27 May – PM Martynov is fired by President Krasnoselsky, who replaces him with Minister of Agriculture and Natural Resources Aleksandr Rozenberg.
 30 May – Aleksandr Rozenberg officially becomes the new Prime Minister of Transnistria.

June 
 5 June – 2022 Transnistria attacks: Two explosives are reported to have been launched from a drone over a military reserve unit in Vladimirovca at 5:10.
 15 June – Foreign Minister  held a meeting with Slovakia Ambassador to Moldova Pavol Ivan. Issues with Transnistrian imports and banking were discussed, and both agreed to maintain further communications in the future.

Deaths

See also 

 2022 in Europe
 COVID-19 pandemic in Europe

References 

 
Transnistria
Transnistria
2020s in Transnistria
Years of the 21st century in Transnistria